Wantirna South Football Club nicknamed the Devils, is an Australian rules  football club located 26 km south east of Melbourne in the suburb of Wantirna. The teams wears a bottle-green playing jumper with two white stripes.

Established in 1952 and situated at Walker Reserve Tyner Road in Wantirna South.

Previously known as South Wantirna Football Club until 1997 when club merged with the Wantirna Junior Football Club.

The club competes in Eastern Football Netball League, currently in Division 1 (2020).

Timeline of the Wantirna South Football Club

1952-1956

Croydon-Ferntree Gully Football League B Grade.

Tragedy struck the Walker family in 1953 with the accidental drowning of Jim Walker and his daughter Lorraine at Phillip Island. The community got together and erected the entrance gates and plaque in their memory and from that day the three parcels of land are known as Walker Reserve. The club had minimal success in this league.

1957-1964   Mountain District Football League Division 2

1957 -  Runners up in first season.

1958 - The Devils win club's first senior premiership  defeating Silvan with promotion to First Division.

1959 - Struggled in the top Grade and eventually were wooden spooners (last) in 1960 and 1961.

1965-1966: Division 2 -  Eastern Districts Football League

Invited to be foundation member club of new Eastern Districts Football league and competed in Division 2

Only one win for the first two seasons and demoted to Division 3 for 1967

1967-1985: Division 3

A long lean era for the club.

The Club failed to make finals at any stage, although some encouraging seasons were had. Eventually demoted at the end of 1985 to the newly established Division 4.

1986-1996: Division 4

The 1986 season saw the League add a fourth Division and the club was a founding member of this new lower Grade.

1988 - The club played Finals for the first time since its premiership season of 1958. The Devils lost both finals to Lilydale and Nunawading respectively.

1991 - The Devils finished last of Division 4, winning only 2 games for the season.

1992 & 1993 saw improvement, but no finals appearances

1994 - Senior & Reserves teams qualified for the Finals, but the Seniors lost the Preliminary final to Sandown, and the reserves lost the Grand Final to Mt.Evelyn.

1995 - Saw the club reform an Under 18's side, and had one of its most successful seasons with all three senior sides reaching the Grand Final, but only the Reserves won the premiership. The seniors were runners up losing to Fairpark by four points and the U18's lost to Rowville.

1996 - This season was the club's most successful to this point. Both senior and reserve sides were premiers & named champion club of the EDFL. 
This was the club's first premiership in Eastern Football League, after defeating Waverley in the Grand Final by 25 points. “Devils Double”

1997-2002: Division 3

Newly promoted to Division 3 the club spent most of its time around the middle of the ladder.

2000 - The U18 team won the premiership.

2002 - The club won its second Eastern Football League, premiership defeating Doncaster East by three points. It was also the Devils Golden Jubilee year, providing an opportunity to remember club men and women who contributed to the club.

2003-2004: Division 2

2003 - Promoted to Division 2 for the first time since 1966, the club had an immediate impact although just failed to reach the finals. The Reserves won the premiership.

2004 - Wantirna South won its third Eastern Football League  premiership defeating Montrose in the Grand Final by two points.

2005: Division 1

Entering the top Grade for the first time, won only two games for the season and relegated back to Division 2.

2006-2008: Division 2

2006 - The Devils spent most of the season around the top of the ladder but lost both Finals matches.

2007 - Finished fifth.

2008 - Finished top of the table after the regular season, and won its fourth Eastern Football League premiership defeating Mulgrave by 98 points and promotion to Division 1 for  season 2009.

2009: Division 1

2009 - Finished 12th (last) demoted to Division 2 for 2010 season

2010 - 2011: Division 2

Lean years for the club, which included a temporary relocation to a sub standard Wantirna reserve while the Walker reserve ground was being renovated with a new modern grass surface, drainage and watering system.

2010 - U18 team won the premiership.

2011 - Club finished last and relegated to Division 3 for the 2012 season

2012 - 2014: Division 3

2013 - Lost Grand Final to Doncaster after a strong season.

2014 - The Devils finished the regular season in the top 2 and won the 2014 Division 3 premiership, defeating Templestowe and promoted to Division 2 for 2015. Reserve team also won the premiership- “Devils Double”

2015 - 2018: Division 2

2015 - Started the year well but dropped off due to a mounting injury list finishing outside the top 4 in Division 2, the reserves were in 1st place most of the year but unfortunately lost the grand final.

2016 - The club was hopeful of adding another premiership to its collection with a welcome return to winning more games during the home and away season. The club finished the season runners up however, losing heavily to Bayswater in the Division 2 Grand Final.

2017 - Finished 7th of 10

2018 - The club finished 7th of 10.  Note: the 2 bottom clubs at the end of 2018 (9th & 10th) were relegated under the EFL restructure for the 2019 season.

2019–Present: Division 1

2019 - Due to the restructure of the Eastern Football League, the Devils competed in what was now known as Division 1. This is the same tier the club had been competing in since 2015, but with the renaming of Division 1 to Premier Division, the 2nd Division was renamed Division 1.  After the restructure, the league had 5 divisions with 45 Senior clubs competing.

In 2019, the club finished the regular season 9th of 10. The senior team won 6 games and drew one avoiding relegation by only 2 points in what was a very even competition particularly between the bottom 6 clubs.

2020 - Season abandoned due to Victorian Government imposing liberty restrictions in response to the Covid-19 pandemic. The Devils will continue to compete in Division 1 for season 2021.

Senior Premierships  (6)

Mountain District Football League

1958 - Second Division
Eastern Football League
1996 - Division 4
2002 - Division 3
2004 - Division 2
2008 - Division 2
2014 - Division 3

Premiership Coaches & Captains 
1958:

Coach & Captain - Trevor Wightman

1996:

Coach - Laurie Anderson (playing)

Captain - Brendan Ferres

2002:

Coach - Stevan Jackson

Captain - Jason Heffernan

2004:

Coach - Lee Rowe (playing)

Captain - Michael Jamieson

2008:

Coach - Jason Heatley

Captain - Scott Edgcumbe

2014:

Coach - Matthew Clark

Captain - Andrew Teakel

AFL Players
 Rayden Tallis Hawthorn Hawks
 Kieran McGuinness - Western Bulldogs.
 Aaron Young - Port Adelaide Power, Gold Coast Suns
 Ayden Kennedy - North Melbourne Kangaroos
 Mac Andrew - Gold Coast Suns

Eastern Football League (Australia) clubs
Australian rules football clubs established in 1952
1952 establishments in Australia
Sport in the City of Knox